The 2nd Globes de Cristal Award ceremony honoured the best French movies, actors, actresses, plays, concerts, novels, singers, TV series, exhibitions and fashion designers of 2006 and was launched by the French television channel Paris Première. 19 journalists selected a list of five nominees in each of 12 award categories; 3,000 journalists then voted to determine the winners. The ceremony took place on 5 February 2007 at Le Lido in Paris and was broadcast live on the channel Paris Première.

The dinner included foie gras, veal piccata and a blancmange for dessert. Celebrities in attendance included: Ophélie Winter, Lio, Annie Girardot, Michèle Bernier, Christophe Malavoy, Orlando, Helena Noguerra, Olivia Ruiz, Marina Hands, Bérénice Bejo, Dominique Besnehard, Mathilda May, Léa Drucker, Marc Cerrone, Mazarine Pingeot, Vahina Giocante and Jean-Michel Ribes.

Highlights of the ceremony included a shirtless Philippe Katerine performing Louxor j'adore and designer Ora-Ito complimenting his fiancée's body as his muse: "C'est son corps qui m'inspire. Elle a le plus beau corps".

Winners and nominees 
The winners are denoted in bold.

Cinema 

 Tell No One – Guillaume Canet
 Avenue Montaigne – Danièle Thompson
 OSS 117: Cairo, Nest of Spies – Michel Hazanavicius
 When I Was a Singer – Xavier Giannoli
 The Page Turner – Denis Dercourt

 François Cluzet – Tell No One
 Jean Dujardin – OSS 117: Cairo, Nest of Spies
 Albert Dupontel – Locked Out
 Gérard Depardieu – When I Was a Singer
 Roschdy Zem – 

 Léa Drucker – The Man of My Life
 Mélanie Laurent – Don't Worry, I'm Fine
 Charlotte Gainsbourg – I Do
 Cécile de France – Avenue Montaigne
 Marina Hands – Lady Chatterley

Television 

  – 
 Samantha oups! – 
 Spiral – Alexandra Clert & 
  – 
 Djihad – Felix Olivier

 Chirac : Le Jeune Loup et le Vieux Lion –

Theater 

 Cyrano de Bergerac – Denis Podalydès

 Macadam Macadam – Blanca Li

 Édouard Baer – La Folle et Véritable Histoire de Luigi Prizzoti

Literature 

  – Michel Schneider

 The Photographer –  & Didier Lefèvre

Music 

 Olivia Ruiz – 

 Philippe Katerine –

Others 

 Gérard Rondeau

 Jakob + MacFarlane

 Ito Morabito

 John Galliano

See also 
 32nd César Awards

References

External links 
 Official website
 Globes de Cristal Awards, France (2007)

2007 film awards
Globes de Cristal
Globes de Cristal Awards
Globes de Cristal Awards
Globes de Cristal Awards